Cass is a locality in the Selwyn District of the Canterbury region in New Zealand's South Island.

It is named for Thomas Cass, an important pioneer surveyor in the area.  State Highway 73 passes near the town, and the Midland Line between Christchurch and the West Coast was opened to the town in 1910, with the full line opened in 1923 when the Otira Tunnel was completed.  Since November 1987, the world-famous TranzAlpine passenger train has run through the town. There are 5 houses in Cass today, but only one resident (currently Barrie Drummond), making it one of the few places in the world with a population of one resident.
The Cass Trust Hotel and Tavern  Still Operates  in the Old Ministry of Works Shed. Cass is home to the large civil contracting company, Cass Contracting which employs over 170 highly skilled staff. 

For some time from 1910, while the Midland Line was under construction (and in particular, the tunnel at Arthur's Pass), Cass was the railhead coming from the east coast. At that time, Cass had a population of around 800. The Cass railway station was painted in 1936 by Rita Angus; it is "one of New Zealand's best-loved works of art".

The University of Canterbury has a field station at Cass, commonly used for undergraduate field trips and research. Historically important photographs of the field station were taken by Ellen Heine and are held at the National Museum of New Zealand Te Papa Tongarewa.

References

External links
 Rita Angus’s ‘Cass’
 Cass Contracting

Selwyn District
Populated places in Canterbury, New Zealand